Mischa Willett is an American poet and essayist best known for his work in the poetic elegy and for his academic championship of the Spasmodic poets.

Early life and education
Mischa Willett was born in Phoenix, Arizona to a family associated with People's Church, an offshoot of the Jesus movement, and later moved to the Pacific Northwest region of the United States, where he was raised. He spent much of his childhood exploring the diverse landscapes of the region, from coastal shores to small towns. This deep connection to nature and urban environments would later become a prominent theme in his poetry. From a young age, Willett was drawn to literature, finding inspiration in the works of Romantic and Victorian poets, as well as classical mythology and contemporary American poetry. His early exposure to various literary styles and to the King James Bible helped to shape the development of his own poetic voice.

Willett pursued his passion for literature and writing through his academic studies. He completed his undergraduate degree in English at Wheaton College, a liberal arts institution located in Wheaton, Illinois where he studied under evangelical writers such as Leland Ryken and Alan Jacobs (academic). There, he attended his first poetry readings by poets such as Li-Young Lee, Dana Gioia, and Jeanne Murray Walker. During his undergraduate years, he began to develop his unique style and voice as a poet.

After completing his undergraduate studies, Willett went on to earn a Master of Arts degree from Northern Arizona University, and a Master of Fine Arts in Creative Writing from University of Washington, further honing his skills as a poet under under the direction of Richard Kenney (poet) and Linda Bierds. While at UW, under the auspices of study abroad programs, he first began taking the trips to Rome that would become a recurrent feature in his poetry. Willett also earned a Ph.D. in English, with a focus on British Romanticism and the intersections between poetry, theology, and philosophy. His doctoral research deepened his understanding of the historical and intellectual contexts that have shaped poetic traditions and informed his own creative work. While writing his dissertation, he spent a year as scholar-in-residence at University of Tübingen in Baden-Württemberg, where, he began work on the impressions of Rainer Maria Rilke that would form his second book, The Elegy Beta.

Career

Teaching 
Mischa Willett has held various academic positions throughout his career, teaching at both undergraduate and graduate levels, currently at Seattle Pacific University. His experiences as a professor have allowed him to share his passion for literature, writing, and critical thinking with students from diverse backgrounds. Willett's areas of specialization include British Romanticism, Victorian Literature, Creative Writing, and C.S. Lewis. He has taught a wide range of courses covering topics such as creative writing, literary criticism, and the history of poetic forms.

Writing 
Willett has made a considerable impact in both the literary and academic spheres through his major publications. His poetry collections, "Phases" and "The Elegy Beta," have garnered critical acclaim for their innovative blend of humor, spirituality, and cultural insight. In addition to his poetry, Willett has contributed scholarly articles to prestigious academic journals such as Victorian Literature and Culture (Cambridge University Press) and Victoriographies (Edinburgh University Press). These publications showcase his deep understanding of historical and cultural contexts, further establishing Willett as a prominent voice in both creative and scholarly pursuits.

Editorial work 
Mischa Willett has also made a significant contribution to the scholarly community with his edited edition of "Festus" by Philip James Bailey, published by Edinburgh University Press. This critical edition brings renewed attention to Bailey's work, a once-popular and influential Victorian epic poem that had faded from literary prominence over time. Willett's edition provides readers with a carefully annotated and contextualized version of "Festus," offering insights into the poem's historical background, stylistic features, and thematic concerns. In doing so, he helps to reestablish the poem's relevance within the broader landscape of Victorian literature and opens up new avenues for research and appreciation.

Literary works

Poetry collections 
"Phases" is a collection of predominantly religious poems that showcase Mischa Willett's distinct talent for incorporating irony and humor into his work. Recognized as one of the "Best Books 2017" by the Washington Independent Review of Books, the collection has drawn comparisons to the poetic style of Richard Wilbur. Additionally, the poems in "Phases" demonstrate a keen interest in Italian culture and classical civilizations, enriching the thematic tapestry of the collection. Through this unique blend of spirituality, wit, and cultural insight, Willett offers readers a fresh perspective on religious poetry, contributing to a broader understanding of the diverse forms and expressions that contemporary verse can take.

"The Elegy Beta," Mischa Willett's second book, is an extended meditation on angels as portrayed in Rainer Maria Rilke's "Duino Elegies." In both style and theme, Willett's work has been compared to the Metaphysical poets, particularly John Donne, as well as to John Berryman. Drawing on these influences, "The Elegy Beta" weaves together a profound exploration of the spiritual and the human, engaging readers in an imaginative dialogue with Rilke's vision of the angelic realm. Published as the first poetry book by Mockingbird Press, it gained critical acclaim and was recognized as one of the ten best poetry books of 2020 by Relief Journal.

Critical essays and articles 
Mischa Willett has made significant contributions as an essayist, writing on a variety of topics related to culture and religion. His work has been featured in publications such as The Gospel Coalition, The New Criterion, Chronicle of Higher Education, and First Things. These essays explore contemporary issues and engage in critical conversations around faith, society, and the arts. In addition to his writings on culture and religion, Willett has also shown a keen interest in the Spasmodic poetry movement, examining its historical context and relevance to modern scholars. Through his diverse range of essays and articles, Willett has demonstrated a thought-provoking approach to the exploration of the intersections between literature, culture, and spirituality.

Style and themes 
Willett's poetic style is characterized by a unique blend of humor, irony, and a strong command of language. Drawing inspiration from poets like James Tate and Simon Armitage, Willett's work often tackles serious themes while remaining playful and engaging. In "The Elegy Beta," for example, his use of colloquial language, wordplay, and internal rhyme showcase his ability to captivate readers with unexpected turns of phrase. This lightness of touch, reminiscent of Auden's definition of light verse, allows Willett to tackle heavy topics while maintaining a sense of hope and resilience. His poetry invites readers to lower their guard and appreciate the insights he offers, demonstrating the power of humor and levity in exploring complex human experiences.

Personal life 
Mischa Willett is married to Amber Willett, a choreographer, and together they reside in Seattle, Washington. As a practicing Anglican, Willett's faith plays a significant role in both his personal life and his writing, with religious themes often appearing in his work. The couple's shared passion for the arts and their strong spiritual foundation contribute to a rich and vibrant personal life, which in turn informs and inspires Willett's poetry and essays.

Selected bibliography 
 Willett, Mischa. Phases. Eugene, Oregon: Cascade Books, 2017. Print. 
 Willett, Mischa. The Elegy Beta: and Other Poems. Charlottesville, VA: Mockingbird Ministries, 2020. Print. 
 Bailey, Philip James. Festus: An Epic Poem, edited by Mischa Willett, Edinburgh UP, 2021. Print. ISBN 978-1474457811
 Willett, Mischa. "Another Advent" Mockingbird
 Willett, Mischa. "Dice Will Land as They Will" Ekstasis Magazine
 Willett, Mischa. "The Christological Vision of Pirates of the Caribbean." Christ and Pop Culture October 2017: Vol 5.9.
 Willett, Mischa. "Excuse Me, Love Li." J Journal: New Writing on Justice Spring 2018: 60.
 Willett, Mischa. "Some Reservations: Thinking about Native American Spirituality." Front Porch Republic March 2019: 1-8.
 Willett, Mischa. "Doing Research with Humanities Undergraduates." Chronicle of Higher Education May 2019: 1-3.
 Willett, Mischa. "Past Participle." The Cresset 83.2 2019: 46.
 Willett, Mischa. "Joy of Every Longing Heart: an Advent Meditation." North American Anglican November 2020: 1-6.
 Willett, Mischa. "Small Letters and Sparrows: on Everyday Miracles." Mockingbird Summer 2021: 5-9.
 Willett, Mischa. "4 Simple Ways to Help Your Most-Disconnected Students." Chronicle of Higher Education October 2021: 3-6.
 Willett, Mischa. "The Unit of Wine is the Cup." Christianity and Literature December 2021: 456.
 Willett, Mischa. "The Life and Afterlife of 'Festus'." New Criterion September 2022: 24-29.

References

External links 
 Official website
 Twitter profile
 Interview (print) with Christian Poetics Initiative
 Interview (podcast) with Practicing Gospel
 Critical essay by Mark S. Burrows

1978 births
Living people
Anglican poets
Christian poets
Wheaton College (Illinois) alumni
Christian writers